Nathan Thomas Stanley (born January 24, 1989) is a former American football quarterback. He was signed by the Baltimore Ravens as an undrafted free agent in 2013. He played college football at Southeastern Louisiana University after transferring from the University of Mississippi.

College career

College career statistics

Professional career
Stanley signed with the Baltimore Ravens on May 3, 2013 and was released by the team on May 7, 2013.

Stanley initially joined the San Jose SaberCats as a backup quarterback. Stanley became the starter, however, when original starter Russ Michna was declared out with concussion-like symptoms.

On October 13, 2014, Stanley was signed to the practice roster of the Calgary Stampeders of the Canadian Football League. He was released by the Stampeders on November 6, 2014.

Stanley returned to the SaberCats in 2015, where he again served as backup (this time to Erik Meyer). An injury to Meyer forced Stanley to once again become the team's starter. He returned to the role of backup following Meyer's return. In his second season, Stanley threw a total of twenty touchdown passes (and no interceptions) while winning every game in which he started.

Stanley's SaberCats ultimately advanced to ArenaBowl XXVIII, where they defeated the Jacksonville Sharks 68-47. In the fourth quarter, Stanley was briefly inserted as quarterback for the SaberCats; his lone pass attempt was caught for a touchdown. Stanley became the fourth SaberCats quarterback to throw a touchdown pass in an ArenaBowl (following John Dutton, Mark Grieb, and 2015 teammate Erik Meyer).

On November 9, 2015, Stanley was assigned to the Los Angeles KISS.

On October 14, 2016, Stanley was assigned to the Washington Valor during the dispersal draft. On March 21, 2017, he was placed on refuse to report.

AFL statistics

Stats from ArenaFan:

References

External links
Southeastern Louisiana bio 
Arena Football League bio 

1989 births
Living people
American football quarterbacks
Canadian football quarterbacks
American players of Canadian football
Ole Miss Rebels football players
Southeastern Louisiana Lions football players
San Jose SaberCats players
Calgary Stampeders players
Los Angeles Kiss players
Washington Valor players
Players of American football from Oklahoma
People from Tahlequah, Oklahoma
Baltimore Ravens players